Regal Records may refer to:

Regal Records (1914), a British record label
Regal Records (1920), a Spanish record label
Regal Records (1921), a United States company
Regal Records (1949), a United States company
Regal Records (Canada), a Canadian subsidiary of Capitol Records
Regal Zonophone Records, a British record label

See also  
Regal (disambiguation)